Md Nazrul Islam SPP, ndu, afwc psc is a Major General of Bangladesh Army and incumbent Adjutant General at Army Headquarter. Prior to join AG, he was Director General of Directorate General of Defence Purchase (DGDP). Prior to Join DGDP, he was the Executive Chairman of Bangladesh Export Processing Zone Authority. He also served as Area Commander of Logistic Area, Dhaka Cantonment.

Career 
Nazrul islam has served in Directorate General of Forces Intelligence (DGFI), Armed Forces Division and Military Secretariat (MS) Branch in Army Headquarters. He commanded three Artillery units. He also commanded an artillery brigade at Cumilla Cantonment. He was Acting Director General of Bangladesh Institute of International and Strategic Studies when he was Colonel. Moreover, he has served at the UN mission in Sierra Leone and Democratic Republic of Congo (DRC). On 1st Sep, 2018 he appointed as President of Army Golf Club. He was General Officer Commanding (GOC) of 66 Infantry Division at Rangpur Cantonment. During his tenure at BEPZA, A development agreement was signed to establish ‘BEPZA Economic Zone’ at Bangabandhu Sheikh Mujib Shilpa Nagar (BSMSN).

References 

Bangladesh Army generals
Bangladeshi military personnel
Bangladeshi generals
Year of birth missing (living people)
Living people